David "Dudu" Tassa (born February 10, 1977) is an Israeli rock musician, singer, songwriter and record producer of Mizrahi Jewish descent. Besides having had a successful solo career in Israel, Tassa has been the leader of the internationally acclaimed band Dudu Tassa & The Kuwaitis (2011– ) which plays new renditions of old Iraqi and Kuwaiti songs written and composed by Tassa's late grandfather and great-uncle, Daoud and Salih Al-Kuwaity.

Life and musical career 
Tassa was born and raised in Hatikva Quarter in Tel Aviv, Israel, to a Mizrahi Jewish family from Iraq and Kuwait. He was active in the local community center during his childhood. He studied in the theater program at Ironi Alef High School, and at the age of 15 he released his debut album, "Ohev et Ha'Shirim" (Hebrew: אוהב את השירים, "Loving the Songs"), produced by Yishai Ben Tzur. In 2000, after finishing his military service, Tassa released the album Yoter Barur (יותר ברור, "Clearer"), which was critically acclaimed despite slim sales. in 2002 he joined the band of Israeli satirist Eli Yatzpan’s late night show as lead guitarist.

In 2003 he released his third album, Mitokh Behira (מתוך בחירה, "Out of Choice"), gaining larger exposure than its antecedents. The album also included Tassa's version of "Fog el Nakhal", a famous Iraqi folk song that was also performed by his grandfather Daoud El Kuwaiti. Tassa recorded the song for the film Turn Left at the End of the World, released a year following the album's release. In 2004 Tassa's released his fourth album, Bediyuk Bazman (בדיוק בזמן, "Just in Time"), was released, and in 2006 his fifth album, “Lola” (לולה).

In 2009 Tassa's sixth album, “Basof Mitraglim Le’Hakol” (בסוף מתרגלים להכל, “At the End You Get Used to Everything”) was released. The album featured Radiohead’s lead guitarist, Jonny Greenwood. In the same year Tassa participated in Samuel Maoz’s film Lebanon, playing the role of a Syrian prisoner of war. He later participated in other Israeli films. In 2010 Tassa released a live album named “Akharei Layla Shel Ra’ash” (אחרי לילה של רעש, “After a Noisy Night”, recorded in his 2009 live concert in Zappa club, in Tel Aviv.

In 2012 Tassa released the album “Skharkhoret” (סחרחורת, “dizziness”), and participated in Benny Torati's film "Balada La’Aviv Haboche" (Ballad Of The Weeping Spring).  Two years later, in 2014, he released the album “Ir u’Vehalot” (עיר ובהלות, “Terrors upon the City.”) for which Tassa was awarded the ACUM (Society of Authors, Composers and Music Publishers in Israel) prize as composer of the year.

In 2016, Tassa released the album “Hagoleh” (הגולֶה, "The Exile") most of the lyrics in which he wrote with he wrote in collaboration with Gilad Kahana. In 2017 a second live album was released under the name "Dudu Tassa Be'Hofaa" (דודו טסה בהופעה, "Dudu Tassa Live"), a double album recorded a year earlier in Hangar 11, a famous concert venue in Tel Aviv. In 2018 Tassa collaborated with Israeli poet Eli Eliahu in the production of the album "Igeret el Ha'Yeladim" (איגרת אל הילדים, "Letter for the Children") which included eight compositions by Tassa to Eliahu's original poems.

Dudu Tassa & The Kuwaitis 
In 2011, Tassa released the album Dudu Tassa & The Kuwaitis giving the name to Tassa's new band. The album was based entirely on Iraqi classics from the first half of the 20th century, composed by Tassa's grandfather and great-uncle, Daoud and Salih Al-Kuwaity. Tassa began working on the album about a decade before his release, when he was asked to record the Iraqi classical folk song "Fog el Nakhal" for the soundtrack of "Turn Left at the End of the World". Following this initial experience, Tassa began collecting songs composed by the Al-Kuwaity Brothers and arranging them for an album combining their music with modern music. The album included original recordings of the Al-Kuwaity Brothers and their Iraqi orchestra.

The album was very successful, selling thousands of copies in Israel. Tassa was awarded the prestigious ACUM Prize for the production of the album. The album featured Berry Sakharof, Yehudit Ravitz and Carmela Tassa, Dudu's mother and the daughter of Daoud Al-Kuwaity, who contributed her voice in some Arabic language songs. The single "Wen Ya Galub" from this album was the first song in Arabic to be play-listed on Israel's leading radio stations.

The recording of the first album was documented in the film "Iraq n' Roll" (2011) that tells the story of collecting and reviving the music of the Al-Kuwaity Brothers. The film was screened in many international festivals and won critical praise.

In 2015, Tassa's band's second album, "Ala Shawati", was released, featuring Ninet Tayeb in the single “Dhub Utfatar".

Dudu Tassa & The Kuwaitis toured in the US. and Europe and participated in many rock festivals, such as Coachella Festival and SXSW showcase in Austin, TX, the Sziget Festival in Hungary, and WOMEX. In 2017 the band were chosen by Radiohead as its supporting act for its 2017 USA tour and its concert in Israel.

In October 2018 the band's new album "El Hajar" ("abandonment" in Arabic) was released.

Personal life 
Tassa married Noa Kram on 30 September 2014. They have a daughter (born 2015) and a son (born 2017).

References 

==External links==
Dudu Tassa & The Kuwaitis' website
 

1977 births
Living people
Israeli composers
Israeli male film actors
Israeli Sephardi Jews
21st-century Israeli male singers
Israeli guitarists
Israeli pop singers
Israeli male singer-songwriters
Israeli rock singers
Israeli record producers
Arabic-language singers
Israeli Mizrahi Jews
Israeli people of Iraqi-Jewish descent